You Still Got Me is the third studio album by American country music artist Doug Supernaw. Released in November 1995, the album produced the single "Not Enough Hours in the Night", a Top 5 hit for Supernaw on the Hot Country Songs charts in 1996. The track "Roots and Wings" later served as the title track to James Bonamy's 1997 album Roots and Wings, while "The Note" was released in 1998 as a single by Daryle Singletary on his album Ain't It the Truth.

Track listing

Personnel
 Acoustic Guitar - Billy Joe Walker, Jr., Skip Ewing
 Background Vocals - Doug Supernaw, Curtis Young, Curtis Wright
 Bass guitar - Glenn Worf, David Hungate
 Drums - Paul Leim
 Electric Guitar - Brent Mason, Dann Huff
 Fiddle - Stuart Duncan, Glen Duncan
 Keyboards - Carl Marsh
 Lead Vocals - Doug Supernaw
 Percussion - Terry McMillan
 Piano - Mitch Humphries, Hargus "Pig" Robbins
 Steel Guitar - Paul Franklin, Sonny Garrish
 Strings - Nashville String Machine

Chart performance

Album

Singles

References
[ You Still Got Me] at Allmusic

1995 albums
Giant Records (Warner) albums
Doug Supernaw albums
Albums produced by Richard Landis